Cut Knife is a town located in the Canadian province of Saskatchewan on Highway 40, northwest of Saskatoon and 55 km (34 miles) west of North Battleford. The population of Cut Knife in 2011 was 517.

Nearby are Poundmaker Cree Nation and Little Pine First Nation to the north in Paynton, Sweetgrass First Nation to the east, and Hillsvale Hutterite Colony to the north-west of the town.

History
Cut Knife is named after Cut Knife Hill (now called Chief Poundmaker Hill) situated on the Poundmaker reserve. The hill was named after a Sarcee chief killed nearby by the Cree in the 1840s.

The town is close to the site of the Battle of Cut Knife which occurred during the North-West Rebellion of 1885.

Demographics 

Attractions
At Cut Knife is the "World's Largest Tomahawk", the Poundmaker Historical Centre and the Big Bear monument.  There is also now, correctly located, a cairn erected by the Historic Sites and Monuments Board of Canada upon Cut Knife Hill overlooking the Poundmaker Battle site and Battle River valley.

The tomahawk is located in the Tomahawk Park next to the Clayton McLain Memorial Museum. It was built in 1971 as a symbol of unity and friendship with the First Nations of the area. It was designed in 1970 by UMA Engineering of Saskatoon, Saskatchewan.

See also
Cut Knife Airport

References

Cut Knife No. 439, Saskatchewan
Towns in Saskatchewan
Division No. 13, Saskatchewan